Schizophonia is a 2005 album by Rinôçérôse.

Track listing 
 "Get Over It Now"
 "Stop It Already"
 "Bitchtits"
 "Friction Dancer"
 "Skin"
 "Pleasure and Pain"
 "My Demons"
 "Cubicle"
 "Fucky Music" (Motorcycle Boy Version)
 "Fahr Zur Hölle"
 "323 Secondes de Silence Répétitif Sans Guitare Espagnole"
 "Fucky Music" (Live)

2005 albums
Rinôçérôse albums
V2 Records albums